Team Pro Circuit is a Motorcross and Supercross team based in Corona, California. It is owned and operated by Mitch Payton. Team Pro Circuit competes in the AMA Motocross and Supercross championships on Kawasaki 250cc four-stroke motorcycles.

Team Pro Circuit has hosted over 50 riders, winning 30 AMA professional championships and collecting accolades including 150 AMA Supercross wins, over 100 AMA Motocross wins and 6 MXON victories .Pro Circuit has won more championships AMA championships than any of their competitors.

Notable riders who have competed with Team Pro Circuit include; Ricky Carmichael, Jeremy McGrath, James Stewart, and Ryan Villopoto.



History 
Team Owner Mitch Payton started riding motorcycles when grandparents bought him a Honda C90 Step Through. His passion developed over the years to the point where he was racing motorcycles competitively in the deserts of California. At age 17, Payton was racing in California City, California. Payton fell violently down a steep hill, damaging the nerve passages along his spine, resulting in him losing the use of his legs.

Following the incident, Payton wanted to stay in the motorcycle racing community and did so by purchasing the motorcycle store that supported him during his racing days " Anaheim Husqvarna " in 1978. Along with selling Motorcycles themselves, Payton designed and produced components such as exhaust pipes and suspension components to improve the performance of the motorcycles. Payton thought it unlikely that other motorcycle shops would stock and sell his performance parts if they were marketed under the business name of his motorcycle shop, which was competing for customers. Payton's solution was the creation of a business name to sell his parts, "Pro Circuit". A Friend of Payton campaigned for him to build parts for other brands of motorcycles, something at the time Payton thought was redundant as those motorcycles seen to have good performance. The first component he produced for a make of motorcycle other than Husqvarna was an exhaust for a 125cc Honda motorcycle. Sales of the exhaust far surpassed Payton's expectations. Payton took this success as a sign he should expand his product line even further to making parts for all makes and models.

Payton's success caught the attention of big name riders and industry people alike, including Motorcross legend Rodger De Coster who was running the Factory Honda professional racing effort at the time. De Coster met with Payton to try his performance parts, specifically his exhaust pipe and modified engine, De Coster was impressed and contracted Payton to supply his team with engines.

At the end of 1990 De Coster approached Payton and asked him if he would be interested in taking over the Factory Honda racing team in a management position. Payton accepted forming what formally became known as a "satellite" style team.

Team Peak / Pro Circuit / Honda : 1991–1992 

In 1991 Payton ventured into professional racing with Team Peak / Pro Circuit/ Honda.

The most notable rider to join the team in its first year was Jeremy McGrath. McGrath signed a contract Factory Honda from amateur racing. McGrath was startled when Honda assigned him to Team Pro Circuit as the team was brand we and considered to be a satellite team.

In 1991 Team Pro Circuit won the Supercross lites class in the west division ( rider: Jeremy McGrath) and east division ( rider: Brian Swink). Both Jeremy Beuhl and Steve Lamson finished in podium positions in their respective Supercross lites championships. This represented a monumental achievement for the team. From this point the team established its place as a front runner in the Supercross lites championship.

In 1992 Jeremy McGrath again won the Supercross Lites West championship aboard a Honda, with Buddy Antunez following behind in second place. Team Pro Circuit didn't have the same success in the East division.

Despite a successful two seasons, the end of 1992 saw Honda decide to dissolve their support for the team.

Team Splitfire / Pro Circuit /  Kawasaki: 1993–2000 

The season of 1993 was Team Pro Circuits first year with sponsorship from Kawasaki motorcycles. This partnership formed late in the 1992 offseason as the team expected continued support from Honda. Honda's withdrawal lead to financial struggles. Payton was forced to search for financial sponsorship as Kawasaki was only able to supply bikes and parts as they had already assigned their sponsorship cash pool to other teams.

Hot Wheels, the popular toy brand came to the team's rescue. However, the sponsorship was not without controversy. The sponsorship came after a dispute over the name of a video game the toy maker was producing. The game used the trademarked title "Pro circuit". Mitch Payton demanded that Hot Wheels pay him royalties or sponsor his racing team. They chose the latter. The team achieved Supercross championships in the 1993, 1995, 1996, 1998, 1999, 2000.

Ricky Carmichael signed with the team in 1997. He won the team an outdoor championship in his rookie season. This was a monumental achievement as it seemed the team had finally been able to translate their success in Supercross ( indoor ) to the Motocross (outdoor) championship. Furthermore, this period represented the formative years of Ricky Carmichael, who would go on to be one of the best riders of all time.

Team Pro Circuit/ Kawasaki:  2001–2003 
In 2001 the team again experienced a significant change in sponsorship. Hot Wheels withdrew their support for the team and Splitfire spark-plugs where far less prominent on the team's motorcycles. Kawasaki stayed on as the motorcycle sponsor.

During this period team experienced a dry spell in the Supercross series. From 2000 to 2003 no championships were won. The drought was finally broken in 2004 by Ivan Tedesco.

During the same period Mike Brown won the 2001 Motocross championship

Team Monster Energy / Pro Circuit / Kawasaki: 2004–2019 

Supercross and Motocross racing changed significantly in this period as teams began to compete almost exclusively on 4 stroke motorcycles. Motorcycle manufacturers, including Kawasaki had invested heavily in 4 stroke technology in the preceding years, primarily focusing on higher displacement motorcycles. In 2004 the first production Kawasaki KX250F was released and as such, Team Pro Circuit changed their development focus from 2 stroke 125cc motorcycles, to 250cc four-stroke motorcycles. The new four-stroke motorcycles were heavier by comparison to the highly-optimised 2-stroke motocycles that had evolved over the years, however also represented significant advantages over the 2 stroke bikes. Payton tried to avoid racing 4 strokes, however, did not have his way. R&D demands on the team leading up to the 2004 season were sizeable. The team was tasked with optimising much more complicated motorcycles. Payton hired experts to advise him on how to develop his new race machines. The team engaged in rigorous testing to sort the suspension on the new motorcycles and arrived on the start line in 2004 ready to race.

Monster Energy came on as a title sponsor and the team rebranded.

They experienced success immediately with Ivan Tedesco in the Supercross season of 2004, taking the championship. This marked the start of 9 consecutive championship winning years for Team Pro Circuit.

In the following years, Pro Circuit dominated the 250cc Supercross and Motocross competitions, winning all the championships the team contested in 2005 and 2007.

2006 saw the arrival of Ryan Villopoto who would go on to become one of the most successful riders in recent history. Villopoto dominated the competition, winning championships in each of the three years he competed with Team Pro Circuit before moving on after the 2008 outdoor season.

In 2013, Team Pro Circuit introcuced 11 time AMA Amateur National Motocross Champion Adam Cianciarulo to the team. This came about though Mitch Paytons relationship with "Team Green" , Kawasaki's amateur racing effort which Cinaciarulo was part of. Having been the most winning rider in amateur Motocross history, and also winning his first ever Supercross race, Cianciarulo was forecast to be the sports next big superstar. However, in 2013 Team Pro Circuit failed to earn any championship titles. A championship-less streak lasting 3 years followed. Rider injuries plagued the team. Contracted riders were unable to compete and results were not as good as they had been passed.

Justin Hill won the team's first championship in 4 years in 2017, taking the Supercross Lites West title.

In the years since, Team Pro Circuit has been present in the championship chase.

Notably in 2019, Team Pro Circuit held leading positions in the Supercross lites 250 East and West competitions before injury and mistakes resulted in the team losing both championships.

Current Motorcycle 
Team Pro Circuit currently race the 2022 Kawasaki KX250F. The motorcycle is modified by Team Pro Circuit subject to the AMA Rule Book.

In its stock form, the motorcycle has the following technical specifications. ( Sourced from the manufacturers website)

Engine[edit]

 Engine: single cylinder 250cc four stroke engine.
 It is water cooled and utilises "DOHC" technology.
 The bore x stroke: 77.0 x 53.6mm.
 Compression ratio: 13.4:1
 Fuel system: DFI® with 43mm Keihin throttle body, dual injectors
 Ignition: Digital DC-CDI
 Transmission: 5-speed 
 Final Drive: Chain

Suspension[edit]

 Front : 48mm inverted "Showa SFF" telescopic fork featuring preload, rebound and compression adjustment.
 Rear : "Uni-Trak®" linkage system paired with a Showa shock with high and low speed compression dampening, rebound dampening and preload adjustment.

Chassis[edit]

  Frame type: Aluminum perimeter
 Rake / Trail: 28.4°/4.8 in
 Overall Length: 85.5 in
 Overall Width: 32.5 in
 Overall Height: 50.0 in
 Ground Clearance: 12.8 in
 Seat Height: 37.2 in
 Curb Weight: 230.3 lb

Features of the Team Pro Circuit racing machine are:

 Data acquisition hardware mounted on below the handlebars. It stores an SD card that stores data on how the motorcycle is running.
 A custom front brake hose clamp that is stronger than the stock component.
 Light Speed carbon front disc guard and skid plate.
 BRAKING rotors and larger Nissin titanium calipers. 
 Dunlop tires and Excel A60 rims.
 Titanium Axels with DLC coating.
 Custom radiators with carbon fibre braces.
 Custom built cams, intake air boots and throttle body designed and manufactured at the Pro Circuit facility in Carona.
 Engine cases are carekoted or hard anodized for added strength.
 Pro Circuit water cover/ impeller and oil pump cover for improved flow.
 Pro circuit Radiator hoses. 
 Pro Circuit Ti-6 pro muffler.
 Hinson clutch components.
 Titanium bolts for weight saving.
 Custom titanium footpegs.
 Pro Circuit link arm and knuckle.
 Showa "A Kit" suspension.
 Twin Air air filter.
 Modified sub-frame.
 RK chain.
 Renthal Sprockets.

Contested Series 
Team Pro Circuit currently competes in the United States. The team competes in 250cc competitions in both Supercross and Motocross. Team Pro Circuit competes in the following professional series;  

AMA Supercross Championship :

The Indoor motorcycle racing championship in the United States. Competition takes place in the winter months.

AMA Motocross Championship:

The premiere Motocross racing championship in the United States. Competition takes place in the summer months.

Current Team Personnel

Owner / Team Manager 

 Mitch Payton

Research and Development 

 Zach White
 Iain Southwell
 Jon Primo
 Adam Walters

Mechanics 

 Olly Stone
 Colter Ahrens
 Kyle Defoe
 Brandon Zimmerman

Transportation Specialist 

 James Shoffner

Brand Associations and Sponsorship 
Notable current and past brand sponsorships and associations.

Notable Riders 

Over the years Team Pro Circuit has housed many successful riders. Some notable riders are listed below.   

Jeremy McGrath
Ricky Carmichael
Ivan Tedesco
Grant Langston
Ben Townley
Ryan Villopoto
Adam Cianciarulo
 Mike Brown
 Ryan Hughes
 Dean Wilson
 Blake Baggett

Results 
Results for Team Pro Circuit in each year of competition.

References 

Motorcycle racing teams
AMA Motocross Championship
Corona, California
Sports teams in California
Motorcycle racing teams established in 1991
1991 establishments in California